József Orbán (born 11 November 1958) is a Hungarian wrestler. He competed in the men's freestyle 62 kg at the 1988 Summer Olympics.

References

1958 births
Living people
Hungarian male sport wrestlers
Olympic wrestlers of Hungary
Wrestlers at the 1988 Summer Olympics
Sportspeople from Győr